Events from the year 1725 in Sweden

Incumbents
 Monarch – Frederick I

Events

 - Public bath houses are banned to prevent the spread of syphilis. 
 - The new building of the Danviken Hospital is completed.
 - Inauguration of the Finnish Church, Stockholm.

Births

 
 Anna Maria Rückerschöld, cookery book author and social critic  (died 1805) 
 Brita Ryy, educator  (died 1783) 
 Anna Maria Brandel, industrialist (died 1799)

Deaths

 
 
 April - Maria Romberg, convicted murderer (born 1697) 
 May 23 – Anna Maria Schmilau, tapestry artist

References

 
Years of the 18th century in Sweden
Sweden